Stéphanie Dubois (born October 31, 1986) is a former tennis player from Canada. She turned professional in 2004 and achieved a career-best ranking of world No. 87 in January 2012.

Dubois was awarded Female Player of the Year by Tennis Canada two times (2005, 2007). She retired after the tournoi de Québec in September 2014.

Tennis career

2004–07
Dubois made her first appearance in July 2004 in the Fed Cup World Group Play-offs against Switzerland. She reached her first WTA quarterfinal at the 2005 Challenge Bell in Quebec City. At the 2006 Rogers Cup, she scored the biggest win of her career when she defeated Kim Clijsters (who retired from the match), to reach the third round. In 2007, Dubois and Renata Voráčová reached the Challenge Bell final but lost to Christina Fusano and Raquel Kops-Jones in straight sets.

2008–10
In 2008, she got in the main draw of the Australian Open and the French Open, participating in a first in the latter, where two Quebec native players were in the main draw by their own ranking for the first time. Also in 2008, Dubois had three match points against eighth seed Anna Chakvetadze in the first round of Wimbledon but lost with a score of 6–8 in the final set. She also reached the third round of the 2008 Rogers Cup for the second time of her career with a victory over world No. 20, Maria Kirilenko. In 2009, Dubois won the $75k ITF Vancouver Open by beating the top seed Sania Mirza in three sets. Also in 2009, she defeated Kristina Mladenovic in the first round of the US Open, her first Grand Slam main-draw win, before losing to Sorana Cîrstea in the second round.

2011–2014
Dubois reached the second round at Wimbledon in 2011 where she lost to world No. 11, Andrea Petkovic, in three sets. She reached at the end of July 2011 the second WTA quarterfinal of her career at the Citi Open in College Park, but lost to Tamira Paszek in a match that lasted almost four hours. In January 2012, Dubois won her first-round match at the Australian Open for the first time, with a win over Elena Vesnina. She lost in the second round to 30th seed Angelique Kerber. At the 2012 Summer Olympics, she teamed with Aleksandra Wozniak to represent Canada in the women's doubles; they lost in the opening round.

In September 2014, Dubois retired from tennis after losing in the first round of the Tournoi de Québec.

Life after tennis
In the spring of 2015, Dubois studied in communication at Promédia. She married British Oliver Sheath in July 2015 and gave birth to their daughter Alicia in April 2017 and Annabelle later.  Dubois lives in Kent and works as a tennis analyst for the WTA. She also has a level-3 coach certification from the LTA.

WTA career finals

Doubles: 1 (runner-up)

ITF Circuit finals

Singles: 23 (10–13)

Doubles: 17 (8–9)

Grand Slam singles performance timeline

Record against top-50 players
Dubois' win–loss record (8–32, 20%) against players who were ranked world No. 50 or higher when played is as follows: Players who have been ranked world No. 1 are in boldface.

 Olga Govortsova 3–0 
 Kim Clijsters 1–0
 Carla Suárez Navarro 1–0
 Květa Peschke 1–0                 
 Maria Kirilenko 1–1
 Ai Sugiyama 1–2
 Victoria Azarenka 0–1 
 Jelena Janković 0–1
 Venus Williams 0–1  
 Nadia Petrova 0–1 
 Anna Chakvetadze 0–1
 Angelique Kerber 0–1 
 Andrea Petkovic 0–1 
 Nathalie Dechy 0–1
 Shahar Pe'er 0–1 
 Roberta Vinci 0–1 
 Ágnes Szávay 0–1 
 Zheng Jie 0–1
 Tamarine Tanasugarn 0–1 
 Virginie Razzano 0–1
 Lucie Šafářová 0–1 
 Sybille Bammer 0–1
 Klára Zakopalová 0–1 
 Sorana Cîrstea 0–1
 Tamira Paszek 0–1 
 Bethanie Mattek-Sands 0–1
 Tsvetana Pironkova 0–1 
 Julia Vakulenko 0–1 
 Chanelle Scheepers 0–1 
 Rebecca Marino 0–1  
 Pauline Parmentier 0–1  
 Sara Errani 0–2
 Katarina Srebotnik 0–2

Awards
 2005 – Tennis Canada female player of the year
 2007 – Tennis Canada female player of the year

Notes

References

External links

 
 
 
 

1986 births
Living people
Canadian expatriate sportspeople in England
Canadian female tennis players
French Quebecers
Olympic tennis players of Canada
Racket sportspeople from Quebec
Sportspeople from Laval, Quebec
Tennis players at the 2012 Summer Olympics